Sina Shamsavari (born October 22, 1976) is a figure in the queer punk zine movement, publishing stories such as Boy Crazy Boy and Concerned Muthers. Born in Manchester, Shamsavari grew up in an area where being queer was not accepted. He started publishing queer zines and comics as an outlet, and has showed up in numerous anthologies. Currently working as a lecturer at the London College of Fashion, Shamsavari continues to study queer zines and comics and teach about their importance.

Early life 
Shamsavari was born in 1976 in Manchester, UK, to Iranian parents. Growing up during a time where homophobia was prevalent, Shamsavari was influenced by Trina Robbins, Robert Kirby (cartoonist), Jon Macy, and Larry-Bob Roberts to start publishing queer zines starting when he was 16 years old. He joined the queer comics zine because he wanted an outlet where he could be himself, and his voice could be heard.

Career 
Shamsavari started publishing during the queer punk movement, which started in the 1980s and was at its prime in the 1990s. It was classified as not only a movement but a subculture- a subculture of people trying to overthrow hetero-normative thinking and mainstream punk behavior. Contributions to this subculture not only included zines and comics, but also music, books, and more. In an interview with Beige Magazine, Shamsavari stated that "it's important for people form different backgrounds to take an active role in creating their own culture, and not simply taking in what mainstream media promotes". Queer comics are a lot more diverse than mainstream comics would like you to think, and Shamsavari wanted to "put more idiosyncratic and interesting" comics out there. First starting out with publishing Concerned Muthers, Shamsavari later went on to publish Atomic Love, Boy Crazy Boy, and appeared in anthologies such as Robert Kirby's Book of Boy Trouble. A lot of Shamsavari's works, especially Boy Crazy Boy, centered around the theme of wanting to elaborate on the experience of growing up queer in a world that doesn't accept who you are. His comics legitimized being queer in the 1990s and normalized having crushes on people of the same sex by showing the everyday circumstances of a normal, queer man.

In addition to his comics, Shamsavari has also done illustration work for companies such as Healthy Gay Living Centre, and Glam and the Terrence Higgins Trust.

Notable works

Concerned Muthers 
An anthology comic marketed towards "queer teens and straight mates." Ran for 7 issues, and had supernatural stories with demons and fairies. Laurence Roberts, the author of Holy Titclamps published 'Concerned Muthers' in one of his queer zine explosions.

Boy Crazy Boy 
Autobiographical comic regarded as his most popular work. It took a very humorous tone while addressing the real thoughts, troubles, and instances of a queer man in the 1990s.

Art Fag (UK) 
A self-published series where Shamsavari recounts moments from his daily life with a heavy sense of humor. It blends moments of romantic life with family life in an unforced way that contains no fake or forced modesty.

References 

Wikipedia Student Program
1976 births
Living people
LGBT comics creators
British comics artists
comics artists
English LGBT writers